Group A of the 2012 Fed Cup Europe/Africa Zone Group I was one of four pools in the Europe/Africa zone of the 2012 Fed Cup. Three teams competed in a round robin competition, with the top team and the bottom team proceeding to their respective sections of the play-offs: the top team played for advancement to the World Group II Play-offs, while the bottom team faced potential relegation to Group II.

Estonia vs. Bulgaria

Estonia vs. Austria

Austria vs. Bulgaria

References

External links
 Fed Cup website

2012 Fed Cup Europe/Africa Zone